IncrediBots is a physics simulation game and series produced by Canadian studio Grubby Games and was later purchased by Big Fish Games. It uses the Box2D physics engine, which allows objects created in a simple click and drag fashion to interact realistically. Users can create basic geometric shapes such as triangles, rectangles, and circles, and then connect them together using different types of joints. The three basic kinds of joints are fixed joints (which permanently connect two shapes together to form a larger solid shape), rotating joints (which allow rotational movement), and sliding joints (which give objects one-dimensional linear movement, much like a pneumatic piston). Once combined with shapes, these joints form what are known as "'bots", "robots", or "IncrediBots". One other kind of joint, thrusters, are like rocket engines.

IncrediBots allows movement in a two-dimensional plane, in which the bottom of the user's screen is the gravitational 'down'. Although this lack of a third dimension can be limiting, it allows for much easier construction and faster processing speeds.

On November 20, 2010, the IncrediBot series' servers were shut down. The games are now available offline. Going to the website will take users to the community forum.

As of March 31, 2011, the forums and official game edits are now hosted on the original domain and are maintained by the current IncrediBots staff.

Gameplay 

IncrediBots includes three different modes of gameplay. The first, and by far most used, is the sandbox mode. In this mode, the player is allowed to build on top of a large, green platform, with a limit of 750 shapes. In another kind of gameplay, called 'challenges' (IncrediBots 2 only), the player is presented with user-created obstacles which must be reached despite author-set restrictions on the 'bot'. The player receives a score upon completion of each challenge, which may be submitted to the game's high score database. The submitted scores are viewable on a high score list, along with their replays and user names. The third mode of gameplay is the list of tutorials, which show how to play.

In Sandbox Mode and in the Tutorials, the game is made up of two 'parts'. The first is the editing view, in which shapes are created and connected and the "bots" are made. When the player is done creating their robot, then they may click the 'Play' button, which initiates the simulation and allows the user to control their creation using the user-set joint activation keys. While in this mode, players may not edit their robot, but instead may use it for the purpose it was constructed for.

Bots are constructed with two basic tools: shapes and joints. Shapes include rectangles, circles and triangles. Shapes have different settings, such as the ability to fixate them to their position, the ability to toggle collision with other shapes (excluding the sandbox), and the ability to alter their density. In IncrediBots, density is a value between 1-30 that can be changed to make the shape lighter or heavier. Shapes actively interact with each other through joints. The types of joints are rotating, sliding and fixed. Fixed joints 'weld' the two shapes together and cannot break. Rotating joints allow for rotational movement, and have a 'motor' that can be enabled. Once enabled, the motor causes rotational movement between the shapes when the user-set key is pressed, or automatically if set to do so. Rotating joints also have a set power and speed (between 1-30), user-defined upper and lower rotation limits much like a servo motor, and these joints can break. They also have a floppy or non-floppy option, which toggles a rotational 'brake'. Sliding joints are similar to 2-dimensional pneumatic pistons. They connect two objects but are unique in that the two objects do not have to be overlapping, and in that they collide with other shapes and add weight to the objects. Like rotating joints, they have set power and speed (1-30). Sliding joints also have an auto-oscillation setting which makes them expand and contract automatically. A fourth joint, thrusters, were once available only to "IncrediBots Supporters" in the first two games, but is currently a default joint in IncrediBots 3. They simply create a set amount of force in a chosen direction, applying it when the activation key is pressed, or automatically if set. Combined, shapes and joints allow for a huge amount of flexibility in creation.

User accounts 

IncrediBots allows users to create accounts on the company's servers, in which prior to October 2010 players could store their 'sandbox creations' and high scores. From October 2010 onwards, creations must be stored on a separate computer, in the form of a file (.ibro, .ibch, and .ibre). They can also be stored in raw text files which can be placed on the internet as well as in a drive. As of November 2010, pre-existing accounts stored on the Amazon servers were deleted, along with associated bots not saved to an alternative location. New accounts created on the new IncrediFriends/IncrediBots website only work on the forums, where players may discuss their bots and strategies for construction. The game's relatively close incorporation into the forums allows moderators to view and remove the game's reported contents.

The forums also hold areas for users to assemble 'teams', closer groups of 12 players or less who collaborate on bot projects. They may compete in team competitions against other teams for points. The team competitions are created and hosted by a small group of specially selected 'Challenge Developers' who are highlighted in orange, members of which aren't allowed to join teams like the others. Teams now are set by a challenge sent to test users for fair teams.

Other than teams, IncrediBots also has clubs. Clubs are different from teams, as the user may request to join. Some clubs are non-bot building clubs, and these clubs usually post in the off-topic forum. 

On the IncrediBots forums, users have many different ranks or jobs. The majority of players are normal users, with no specific job, but have certain ranks depending on how many posts they have. A smaller group of users, nicknamed 'superusers', have specific jobs, ranging from moderators and reviewers to administrators and contest winners. There are also a couple of groups for honorary positions, such as 'Former GG Mod' and 'Retired Superuser'.

Supporters 

Although the basic versions of IncrediBots and IncrediBots 2 are free-to-play, it was possible to become an "IncrediBots supporter" for a cost of twelve dollars for six months. Supporters received access to several additional features in IncrediBots, including thrusters, (which function much like a rocket engine) the ability to scale and flip their creations, and 'cannons'. A recent addition to IncrediBots 2, 'cannons' are special rectangles which spawn circles traveling at an amount of speed and force set by the user. The size of the 'bullet' spawned is corresponding with the size of the cannon out of which it was shot. Cannons hold 50 rounds. 
There are three methods of becoming an "IncrediBots supporter":
 Clicking "Become a Supporter" on the main game screen.
 Sponsorship - when another user covers the cost of the membership for another user.
 Winning a competition on the site's forums. There is a regular competition in which a Forum Moderator picks out 6 users to receive a one-month supportership each.
The IncrediBots supporter payment system (provided by Plimus, now known as BlueSnap) is currently unavailable; therefore, all methods of becoming a supporter (apart from the contests, which remain functional as the activation does not use Plimus) are useless. The open-source version has all the supporter features plus new ones for free.
Now, in light of a lesser need to pay for servers, the supporter feature has been dissolved. The IncrediBots server is run on donations from users and administrators. Donators are given extra features if requested, and those who achieve the 'Pink Star', the highest reward for donating a large sum, receive access to a hidden forum. Donators can choose to remain anonymous, although the user account associated with the donation will not receive any Pink Stars.

Development 

IncrediBots started as a simple physics engine (Box2D) coupled with a limited user interface. It was publicly released on October 31, 2008. On December 19, IncrediBots Gold features (also known as supporter features) were implemented into the game. This was the first non-advertisement revenue source for the game. On January 9, 2009, IncrediBots beta testing ended. Up to this point, the entire game had still 'been in development'. Finally, on March 17, 2009, IncrediBots 2 was released for private beta testing.

Grubby Games believes "...that something is being forgotten in this era of multimillion-dollar games with cutting-edge graphics. As lifelong gamers, we understand that flashy graphics are much less important than solid gameplay." After the open-source version of IncrediBots was released, two users called "jayther" and "pokeybit" have handled the technical side of managing IncrediBots.

IGF Nomination 
One thing that distinguishes IncrediBots from other online games is that it has been nominated as a finalist in the 11th National Independent Games Festival. The Independent Games Festival (IGF) is an annual festival at the Game Developers Conference, the largest annual gathering of the indie video game industry. It was founded in 1998 to assist and inspire innovation in video game development and to recognize the best independent video game developers.

IncrediBots 2 
On March 17, 2009, IncrediBots 2 was opened to paying supporters for testing. It fixed many bugs and glitches present in IncrediBots, as well as providing more ways to manipulate creations. For example, IncrediBots 2 allows users to alter the gravitational force that was constant in IncrediBots, as well as alter the simulation 'backdrop', choose different types of grounds, use non-colliding sliding joints, drag shapes during the simulation, edit groups of shapes, and later on supporter's use of cannons. On June 19, 2009, IncrediBots 2 was opened to non-supporter players.

A variant of IncrediBots 2 (branded Jaybit Edition, made by both jayther and pokeybit) has been receiving continuous updates. Its main feature is the ability to load shared or personal bots via a code given to the user when the bot is saved. Since the servers have been shut down, this is the only way to share bots, challenges, and replays. Also, a new feature has been introduced called triggers so that when something touches a shape it triggers an action (motor, sliding joint, etc.)

Server closure and change of ownership
The IncrediBots servers for the games and forums were shut down on November 19, 2010 because, according to Ryan Clark, one of the original IncrediBots developers, "we could not bridge the gap of user expectation, competing game development, and adapting the IB experience to the BFG rules of engagement." After the servers were shut down, an open-source version was released to the public. It can be downloaded here. New developers already began updating the game. In the open-source version, all supporter features are free. Saving the bots is no longer in an ID, rather a text code to enter, also making it possible to play offline. The original forums closed down, so a replacement forum was created. On March 31, 2011, jayther, on the IncrediBots Forums,  announced that the staff of the forums now owned the trademark of IncrediBots, as well as the domain name, so the forums have since then been moved to the original domain.

IncrediBots 3
On October 8, 2011, on the IncrediBots forums, jayther publicly announced that his "business application using box2d" called "Project Legato", was actually the early stages of IncrediBots 3. He also announced that he would be presenting it at Minecon 2011, which also hosted the official release of Minecraft. The third installment of IncrediBots would have water, the newest version of Box2D, a new online saving system, customizable sandbox ground, a new GUI, smoother graphics and more new features. On February 29, 2012, jayther and the IncrediBots administrators secretly added IncrediBots 3 to the IncrediBots website, and waited for users to find it. It was found by curious IncrediBots users, and is currently in a public beta stage.

Incredibots HTML5 port 
As of 2018, user TheDerf was working on porting the game to HTML5 (using the programming language Typescript). The reason was Adobe Flash Player becoming deprecated. As of 2021, the HTML5 port supports all core features of Incredibots 2.23 CE (the open-source version). The author attempted to make the port as faithful to the original Actionscript 3 code as possible. There was even an effort to replicate the simulation glitches in the Flash version. The source code of the port is hosted on Github, where the game can also be accessed online.

Robot Mania 
In December 2022, user SDDFFDDS worked on an Incredibots-inspired game Robot Mania: Physics Sandbox on iOS, iPadOS, and MacOS platforms. As of 2023, Robot Mania supports all core features of the original Incredibots 2 (the Grubby Games version) including challenges and global leaderboards. The game utilizes an updated version of the Box2D physics engine and uses a public cloud storage to host player robots.

References

Browser games
Flash games
2008 video games
Video games developed in Canada
Big Fish Games games
Indie video games